Jean-Charles-Alexandre Sallandrouze de Lamornaix (16 April 1840 in Paris - 18 September 1899 in Cherbourg) was a French admiral who served as the Chief of Staff of the French Navy from 1886 to 1898. He died on the Formidable in the Cherbourg Harbour. He was decorated with the French Legion of Honor, Grand Cross of the Order of Saint Anna, the Order of Saint Stanislaus, the Order of Aviz, the Order of Christ of Portugal, the Order of the Medjidie, the Order of the Sacred Treasure and

References

1840 births
1899 deaths
French Navy admirals
Commandeurs of the Légion d'honneur
Knights of the Holy Sepulchre